Border Force (BF) is a law-enforcement command within the Home Office, responsible for frontline border control operations at air, sea and rail ports in the United Kingdom. The force was part of the now defunct UK Border Agency from its establishment in 2008 until Home Secretary Theresa May demerged it in March 2012 after severe criticism of the senior management.

Border Force was formed on 1 March 2012, becoming accountable directly to ministers. It is responsible for immigration and customs controls and the screening of passengers, freight and port staff at 140 rail, air and sea ports in the UK and western Europe, as well as thousands of smaller airstrips, ports and marinas. The work of the Border Force is monitored by the Independent Chief Inspector of Borders and Immigration.

Border Force officers can hold the powers of both customs officers and immigration officers. 
Their duties also include counter-terrorism, part of which is to detect and deter the illicit importation of radioactive and nuclear material by terrorists or criminals.

Aside from powers listed below in relation to immigration and customs, section 2 of the Borders Act 2007 also allows designated officers of the Border Force to detain anyone for any criminal offence or arrest warrant at a port if the Border Officer thinks they would be liable to arrest by a police constable.  
The power allows detention for three hours pending the arrival of a police constable.  The power also applies to points of entry in Belgium and France where Border Officers work, whereby the Border Officer will turn the detained person over to Belgian or French police officers as appropriate.

History

Background and establishment 
Prior to 2007 three agencies were responsible for border control in the UK:
HM Revenue and Customs (HMRC) (HM Customs and Excise (HMCE) till 2005) dealt with customs, (uniformed customs officers)
Immigration and Nationality Directorate dealt with all immigration roles within the UK and at the border,
and UKVisas issued visas both from the UK and its offices abroad.

As early as 2003, a single "border police force" had been proposed.

In 2005, HMCE and Inland Revenue merged to form HMRC, however HMRC was still responsible for customs control at the border until 2009. Throughout 2006 and 2007 there were suggestions for a merged border control department.

Initially this plan was to turn the Immigration and Nationality Directorate into a uniformed body of Immigration officers at the border, the Border and Immigration Agency. 
The BIA was created on 1 April 2007. It was short lived and was replaced only a year later on 1 April 2008 by the UK Border Agency (UKBA). The UK Border Agency was a merger of the Border and Immigration Agency (BIA), UKvisas and the port customs functions of HM Revenue and Customs. It created one of the largest law enforcement bodies in the UK.

On 5 November 2011, following various failings of the UKBA, then-Home Secretary Theresa May that an independent inquiry would also be undertaken, led by the Chief Inspector of the UK Border Agency John Vine. UK Border Force became a separate organisation on 1 March 2012.

After establishment
The first Director General of Border Force was the former Chief Constable of Wiltshire Police Brian Moore, who was appointed on secondment on an interim basis to last until 31 August 2012 and was expected to apply for the position permanently, despite criticism of his management of passport queues. On 10 July 2012, Immigration Minister Damian Green confirmed that Moore had not applied for the post, despite Moore earlier telling the Home Affairs Select Committee that he would be applying.

Tony Smith was appointed as interim Director General of Border Force on 19 September 2012. Smith was previously Gold Commander for the London 2012 Olympic Programme and Regional Director for London and the South East in the UK Border Agency and has spent forty years in border control and enforcement work.

Vice-Admiral Sir Charles Montgomery was named as the new Director General on 25 January 2013.

In June 2017 Montgomery left Border Force and Paul Lincoln (a civil servant from the MOD and Home office) was appointed as the new Director General. Neither of the two had any previous experience of immigration or customs.

Responsibilities

The stated responsibilities of the Home Office's Border Force are the following: 
 checking the immigration status of people arriving in and departing the UK
 searching baggage, vehicles and cargo for illicit goods or illegal immigrants
 patrolling the British coastline and searching vessels
 gathering intelligence
 alerting the police and security services to people of interest

Border Force is responsible for immigration and customs at 140 rail, air and sea ports in the UK and western Europe, as well as thousands of smaller airstrips, ports and marinas.

Organisation and operations

Border Force has five operational regions: 
Central; 
Heathrow; 
North; 
South; 
and South East & Europe. 

The regions have responsibility for securing the border 24 hours a day, 365 days a year at the UK’s ports, airports, postal depots and rail. 

This includes the Eurostar from Brussels and Paris to St Pancras International and the Eurotunnel from Coquelles to Folkestone.

There are approximately 10,000 people who work in BF, according to the UK Government website.

The regions’ varied work includes stopping 100 per cent of passengers arriving at ports, or airports, for immigration controls. 

Officers also conduct risk-led interceptions for controlled drugs, cash, tobacco, alcohol, firearms, offensive weapons, prohibited goods, counterfeit goods and clandestine entrants. 

They do this at passenger and freight controls, covering passengers travelling on foot, by car, coaches, freight vehicles, as well as air freight and sea containers.

Officers

Members of the BF are known as "Border Force officers" and are civil servants, part of HM's Civil Service.

Powers
Staff hold a mixture of powers granted to them by their status as immigration officers and designated customs officials. Border Force officers are civil servants.

Immigration powers 

Immigration officers have powers of arrest and detention conferred on them by the Immigration Act 1971 and subsequent Immigration Acts, when both at ports and inland. In practice, non-arrest trained Border Force immigration officers exercise powers under Schedule 2 of the Immigration Act 1971, while inland immigration officers work under S28A-H of the Immigration Act 1971 and paragraph 17 of Schedule 2 of the same Act, as do arrest-trained Border Force immigration officers at the frontier.

Historically, port and inland immigration officers received different training to reflect these different approaches to immigration enforcement, which is now reinforced by inland officers working for Immigration Enforcement, a separate Home Office Command.

"Designated Immigration Officers" are Border Force immigration officers who have been designated with additional detention powers, under Sections 1 to 4 of the UK Borders Act 2007, where a person at a port or airport is suspected of being liable to arrest by a police officer for non-border offences.

Customs powers 

Border Force officers, designated as customs officials under the Borders, Citizenship and Immigration Act 2009, have wide-ranging powers of entry, search, seizure and arrest. They hold the same customs and excise powers as officers of HM Revenue and Customs, but cannot use HMRC powers for non-border matters, such as Income Tax and VAT. Amongst their powers is the ability to arrest anyone who has committed, or whom the officer has reasonable grounds to suspect has committed, any offence under the Customs and Excise Acts. They may also seize prohibited and restricted goods, such as controlled drugs and firearms, as well as ensuring that imported goods bear the correct taxes and duties.

Director-General
 Vice-Admiral Sir Charles Montgomery KBE ADC RN, (2013-2017)
 Paul Lincoln OBE (2017–2021)

Interim Director-General
 Phil Douglas (Nov 2021–present)

Rank insignia
Uniformed Border Force officers have their rank displayed on shoulder epaulettes, attached to their shirt, jumper or jacket.

Warranted officers below Senior Officer rank may also have their identification number displayed.

The rank and epaulette styling is in line with many other border agencies and shares close similarities with its Australian counterpart, the Australian Border Force.

Uniform and Equipment
All BF officers wear a dark blue uniform (without headgear) and have certain equipment, to help them do their jobs.

BF officers always wear their rank and personal number on an epaulette (see above).

Officers carry batons, handcuffs, radios and may wear a stab vest, or equipment vest.

Search Dogs
BF have a dog unit and dog handlers. There is a training course called the  Border Force Initial Detector Dog Handler training course. The BF uses dogs in the 'detector dog' way.

Common travel area

Immigration control within the United Kingdom is managed within a wider Common Travel Area (CTA). The CTA is an intergovernmental agreement that allows freedom of movement within an area that encompasses the UK, Isle of Man, Channel Islands (Guernsey, Jersey, Sark and Alderney) and the Republic of Ireland. Authorised entry to any of the above essentially allows entry to all the others but it is the responsibility of the person entering to ensure that they are properly documented for entry to other parts of the CTA. Despite the CTA it is still possible to be deported from the UK to the Republic of Ireland and vice versa.

Juxtaposed controls

Entry to the UK via the Channel Tunnel from France, Belgium or the Netherlands, or by ferry from Calais and Dunkirk in France is controlled by juxtaposed immigration controls. Travellers clear UK passport control in France, Belgium or the Netherlands, while those travelling from the UK to France, Belgium or the Netherlands clear entry border checks to the Schengen Area while in the UK. Belgium and the Netherlands do not maintain controls in the UK as the first Schengen country entered is France. UK Border Force checkpoints in France are operated at the Port of Calais, the Port of Dunkirk, the Eurotunnel Calais Terminal, Calais-Fréthun station, Lille Europe station and Paris Gare du Nord station. For passengers arriving by the Eurostar train from Marne-la-Vallée Chessy station, UK border control takes place at the arrival stations in the UK whereas French border controls take place at Marne-la-Vallée Chessy. A checkpoint operated at Boulogne-sur-Mer until the port closed in August 2010. UK Border Force checkpoints at Amsterdam Centraal and Rotterdam Centraal stations in the Netherlands began operating on 26 October 2020.

United States border preclearance is an equivalent system operated by that country's equivalent to the UKBF at some airports outside the US.

Vessels

All vessels of the Border Force bear the ship prefix "HMC"—His Majesty's Cutter. Between May and October 2015 two of the vessels, HMC Protector and HMC Seeker, were deployed in the Mediterranean conducting search and rescue operations. The Border Force also has a recently chartered vessel named MV VOS Grace.

Attack on the Dover Immigration Centre
On 30 October 2022 the new Immigration Centre in Dover Harbour was attacked with firebombs thrown from a car. Two members of staff were injured. A suspect was found dead in a vehicle and has been named as Andrew Leak, aged 66, from High Wycombe. Responsibility for investigation is now with Counter Terrorism Policing South East. 

Leak's online activities had included far-right content and conspiracy theories.  On 5 November 2022 the police stated that the attack "was motivated by a terrorist ideology".

Notable operations and successes
On 23 April 2015, HMC Valiant assisted by HMS Somerset who had NCA officers on board, Intercepted the MV Hamal, a tug, and after she was searched in Aberdeen the largest UK drug seizure of 3.2 tonnes of cocaine was found onboard, in her forward ballast tank. There was so much on board it took three days to remove and had to be placed under armed guard.
On 31 July 2017, Border Force won a court case where a judge declared child sex dolls to be an obscene item after a seizure of one was challenged.
On 31 January 2018, Border Force officers at Farnborough Airport became suspicious after a routine boarding and inspection of a private jet from Colombia, and upon a Customs search; discovered 500 kg of cocaine worth a street value of £50,000,000 in fifteen suitcases.
During the 2015 European migrant crisis, Border Force rescued over 1,650 migrants and arrested 27 suspected people smugglers over one summer as part of the EU Mission in the Mediterranean Sea.
In February 2017, Border Force took part in Operation Thunderbird organised by INTERPOL to tackle wildlife crime and wildlife trafficking. Border Force officers made 182 seizures during the operation, which ran between 30 January and 19 February. Among the items found were 11 kilos of ivory, 600,000 live eels, 74 live orchids, eight cacti, 13 reptile skin products, around 3,500 musical instruments containing CITES wood.
In December 2012, Border Force seized 1.2 tonnes of fake CDs at Manchester Airport
A couple were convicted in April 2013 for trying to smuggle a Nigerian baby into the UK, claiming it was their own. They were stopped and investigated after Border Force officers became suspicious 
Border Force Detector dog Megan became the most successful UK drug detector dog. Over a seven-year period with Border Force, she foiled 102 smuggling attempts into the UK. She retired in March 2014.
Another Border Force detector dog, Jessie found £1,000,000 being smuggled over a five-month period.
Two separate attempts to smuggle birds into the UK inside suitcases was prevented by Border Force officers at Leeds Bradford Airport in May 2013.
Twelve critically endangered iguanas seized from smugglers by Border Force officers at London Heathrow Airport have been returned home to their native Bahamas. The reptiles were discovered in the baggage of two Romanian nationals on 3 February 2014 by officers carrying out customs checks.
In September 2015, Border Force officers seized a tonne of cannabis at London Gateway port. It came after 2 tonnes were seized there in February 2015.

See also
 Immigration Enforcement
ePassport gates
 His Majesty's Naval Service
 List of customs cutters of UK Border Force
 HM Customs and Excise
 Visa requirements for the United Kingdom
 France–UK border

References

External links

 

2012 establishments in the United Kingdom
Border control
Borders of the United Kingdom
Customs services
Home Office (United Kingdom)